Laura Lynn Fernández Piña (born 11 June 1971) is a Mexican politician from the Party of the Democratic Revolution.

Early life 
She was born in the city of Torreón, Coahuila and grew up in Guadalajara, Jalisco. She earned her degree in marketing from the Universidad del Valle de Atemajac.

Political career 
She served as a local deputy in the XII Legislature of the Congress of Quintana Roo from 2008 to 2011.

Between 2016 and 2022, she was a member of the Ecologist Green Party of Mexico. She was municipal president of Puerto Morelos.

She was elected to the Congress of the Union in the 2021 Mexican legislative election.

In 2022, she left the Green Party and was supported by the Va por México alliance to become Governor of Quintana Roo in the 2022 local elections.

See also 

 LXV Legislature of the Mexican Congress

References 

1971 births
Living people
Deputies of the LXV Legislature of Mexico
Municipal presidents in Quintana Roo
Members of the Congress of Quintana Roo
Politicians from Torreón
Politicians from Guadalajara, Jalisco
People from Quintana Roo
Ecologist Green Party of Mexico politicians
Party of the Democratic Revolution politicians
Women mayors of places in Mexico
21st-century Mexican women politicians
Universidad del Valle de Atemajac alumni
Women members of the Chamber of Deputies (Mexico)